Hotel Shampoo is the third solo album by Welsh musician and Super Furry Animals front-man Gruff Rhys. It was released on 14 February 2011 through Onvi Records/Turnstile (in the UK) and Wichita (in the US) and peaked at number forty-two on the UK Albums Chart. The album includes the singles "Shark Ridden Waters", "Sensations In The Dark", "Honey All Over" and "Space Dust #2"; the latter of which is collaboration with Sarah Assbring and Miles Kane. The album won the 2011 Welsh Music Prize and the Album of the Year award at the Artrocker Awards 2011.

The title of the record is a reference to Gruff’s habit of hoarding mini shampoo bottles and other complimentary hotel products whilst on tour, and the miniature hotel he built from them in advance of the record's announcement.

Samples
The track "Shark Ridden Waters" is built around a sample of "It Doesn't Matter Anymore", as performed by The Cyrkle.

Track listing

International bonus tracks (Floor 3)
14. "I Totally Understand" - 3:40 (US, Japan and Taiwan)
15. "Follow The Sunflower Trail (Theme Tune For A National Strike)" - 4:12 (US and Japan)
16. "Pengwyn Pengwyn" - 1:34 (Taiwan)

Personnel

Musician credits
Gruff Rhys – Guitars, Vocals, Vibraphone, Moog, Korg and Solina Synthesizers
Gorwel Owen – Piano, Moog, Banjo, Jupiter and Stylophone
Owen Evans – Bass
Chris Walmsley – Drums
Sean O'Hagan – String Arrangements (4, 5, 9, 10)
Marcus Holdaway – Cello (4, 5, 9, 10)
Elspeth Cowey – Violin (4, 5, 9, 10)
Morven Bryce – Violin (4, 5, 9, 10)
Harriet Davies – Violin (4, 5, 9, 10)
John Thomas – Pedal Steel (12)
Andrew Kinsman – Saxophone (4, 11)
Gary Alesbrook – Trumpet (5, 10, 11)
El Perro del Mar (Sarah Assbring) – Vocals (9)
Miles Kane – Guitar (9)
Danny Frankel – Percussion (3)
David Ralicke – Brass (3)

Technical credits
Gruff Rhys and Gorwel Owen – Recording (at OFN, Llanfaelog, Wales)
Craig Silvey – Recording (Drums)
Mark Allway – Recording Assistant (Drums)
Joe Watson – Recording (Strings) (at Press Play Studios, London)
John Thomas – Recording (Brass) (at Buffalo Sound Recorder, Cardiff)
David Wrench – Recording (Additional Piano) (at Bryn Derwen, Bethesda)
Andy Votel – Recording (in Manchester) (1, 8)
Gaz Sironical – Recording Assistant (in Manchester) (1, 8)
Mario Caldato, Jr. – Mixing, Additional Overdubs (at MCJ, Los Angeles)
Bernie Grundman – Mastering (at Bernie Grundman Mastering, Los Angeles)
Pete Fowler – Artwork
Mark James – Photography

Charts

References

2011 albums
Gruff Rhys albums
Albums produced by Gorwel Owen
Albums with cover art by Pete Fowler